Menesta is a moth genus of the family Depressariidae.

Species
 Menesta astronoma (Meyrick, 1909)
 Menesta cinereocervina (Walsingham, [1892])
 Menesta melanella Murtfeldt, 1890
 Menesta succinctella (Walker, 1864)
 Menesta tortriciformella Clemens, 1860

References

 
Stenomatinae
Moth genera